Whatever I Want is a six-part British television sketch show, written by and starring Leigh Francis, that first broadcast on ITV on 7 January 2000. Commissioned by Bellyache Productions, and overseen by Gavin Claxton, the series featured early prototypes of the characters of Keith Lemon and Avid Merrion, as well as a human version of The Bear known as Barry Gibson, who had previously appeared as a roving reporter during the early series of Channel 4's Popworld.

The series broadcast at 11:30pm on Fridays in LWT regions only, and has never been repeated since broadcast, nor released on DVD. Each episode featured a number of celebrity guests, including Davina McCall, who first discovered Francis performing in-role stand-up comedy in a southern comedy club, and encouraged him to pursue a career in television. Reworked versions of Keith Lemon and Avid Merrion would later go on to appear as characters in Francis' Channel 4 sketch show Bo' Selecta!.

Characters
 Barry Gibson; a budding television presenter & antique aficionado.
 Avid Merrion; a Transylvanian-celebrity "stalker".
 Keith Lemon; a failed former businessman-of-the-year.

Episodes

References

External links
 

2000 British television series debuts
2000 British television series endings
2000s British television sketch shows
2000s British satirical television series
ITV sketch shows
English-language television shows